Hera is a Greek goddess.

Hera or HERA may also refer to:

People
 Hera, full name Hera Hjartardóttir, an Icelandic/New Zealand singer-songwriter
 Hera Björk (born 1972), Icelandic singer

Characters
 Hera Agathon, a character in the 2004 re-imagined version of Battlestar Galactica
 Hera (Marvel Comics), a Marvel Comics character
 Hera, the superhero codename of Pepper Potts
 Hera Syndulla, a Star Wars character featured in Star Wars Rebels

Biology
 Hera S.Y.Wong, S.L.Low & P.C.Boyce, a genus of Araceae

Astronomy
 Hera (space mission)
 103 Hera, an asteroid
 1 Ceres, briefly bore the name Hera
 Elara (moon), a moon of Jupiter informally known as Hera from 1955 to 1975
 Hydrogen Epoch of Reionization Array (usually called HERA) a radio telescope in South Africa

Places
Heraeum (city of Hera), ancient Greek city
Hieria, derives from Heraion akron (Greek: Ἡραῖον ἄκρον, "Cape of Hera"), ancient Greek city

Other
 Hera (barquentine), a ship that sank in 1914
 Hera (painting), painting by Fabritius c. 1643
 HERA (particle accelerator)
 Hera (rocket)
 Hera, Iran, a village
 Hera, a proposed European spacecraft, part of the AIDA mission
 The Higher Education and Research Act 2017, an act of the UK Parliament
 The Housing and Economic Recovery Act of 2008, an act of the US Congress
 Hera, the Zimbabwean musical instrument also known as matepe
 Hera Group, a multiutility company in Italy
 Hera Gallery, artist cooperative in Rhode Island, USA
 Mac OS X Server 1.0, codenamed "Hera" during production
 Health Emergency Preparedness and Response Authority, abbreviated as HERA